Cinchonain-Ib is a flavonolignan found in the bark of Trichilia catigua used as catuaba. A 2009 study revealed that Cinchonian-Ib derived from boiled Eriobotrya japonica leaves has a glucose-lowering effect in rats, and could possibly be used to manage diabetes mellitus in humans.

References 

Flavonolignans